Alpheoidea is a superfamily of shrimp containing the families Alpheidae, Barbouriidae, Hippolytidae and Ogyrididae.

References

 
Caridea
Taxa named by Constantine Samuel Rafinesque
Arthropod superfamilies